Hombolo Makulu is an administrative ward in the Dodoma Urban district of the Dodoma Region of Tanzania. In 2016 the Tanzania National Bureau of Statistics report there were 9,659 people in the ward.

References

Wards of Dodoma Region